Upasana Singh Thakuri is one of the youngest Nepali film actress who works in Nepali cinema.

Early life 
Upasana Singh Thakuri was born on 20 September 1998.

Career 
In 2019, Thakuri debuted as a film actress in Diwakar Bhattarai's sports drama Captain, where she starred alongside Anmol K.C., and Priyanka Mv. Her performance received mixed responses from critics. Diwakar Pyakurel of Online Khabar observed, "[she] ... plays her role well; but she cannot powerfully reflect varying emotions and moods of the story". For her performance, she was nominated for the Best Debut Actor (Female) award from the Dcine Awards and the NEFTA Film Awards.

The same year, She starred in Ram Babu Gurung's romantic comedy Kabaddi Kabaddi Kabaddi. The film set the record for the highest-grossing opening of a film in Nepal. Her performance in the film was widely praised, one critic wrote: "In comparison to her previous role in Captain, Thakuri has improved a lot. In the movie, she is put in different emotional situations, but she skillfully and realistically reflects them in her facial expression, gesture and dialogues". In 2021, she signed for Pravin Jha's December Falls, where she will appear with Aaryan Sigdel. The same year, she was awarded the National Navdurga Award for her contribution to the Nepali cinema, alongside nine other actresses.

Filmography

Awards

References

External links 
 

{{DEFAULTSORT:Thakuri< Upasana Singh}}
1998 births
21st-century Nepalese actresses
Living people
Nepalese female models
Nepalese film actresses
Place of birth missing (living people)
Actresses in Nepali cinema